Charon (  or  ), known as (134340) Pluto I, is the largest of the five known natural satellites of the dwarf planet Pluto. Charon is the sixth-largest known trans-Neptunian object after Pluto, Eris, Haumea, Makemake and Gonggong. It was discovered in 1978 at the United States Naval Observatory in Washington, D.C., using photographic plates taken at the United States Naval Observatory Flagstaff Station (NOFS).

With half the diameter and one eighth the mass of Pluto, Charon is a very large moon in comparison to its parent body. Its gravitational influence is such that the barycenter of the Plutonian system lies outside Pluto, and the two bodies are tidally locked to each other.

The reddish-brown cap of the north pole of Charon is composed of tholins, organic macromolecules that may be essential ingredients of life.

The New Horizons spacecraft is the only probe that has visited the Pluto system. It approached Charon to within  in 2015.

Discovery

Charon was discovered by United States Naval Observatory astronomer James Christy, using the  telescope at United States Naval Observatory Flagstaff Station (NOFS). On June 22, 1978, he had been examining highly magnified images of Pluto on photographic plates taken with the telescope two months prior. Christy noticed that a slight elongation appeared periodically. The bulge was confirmed on plates dating back to April 29, 1965. The International Astronomical Union formally announced Christy's discovery to the world on July 7, 1978.

Subsequent observations of Pluto determined that the bulge was due to a smaller accompanying body. The periodicity of the bulge corresponded to Pluto's rotation period, which was previously known from Pluto's light curve. This indicated a synchronous orbit, which strongly suggested that the bulge effect was real and not spurious. This resulted in reassessments of Pluto's size, mass, and other physical characteristics because the calculated mass and albedo of the Pluto–Charon system had previously been attributed to Pluto alone.

Doubts about Charon's existence were erased when it and Pluto entered a five-year period of mutual eclipses and transits between 1985 and 1990. This occurs when the Pluto–Charon orbital plane is edge-on as seen from Earth, which only happens at two intervals in Pluto's 248-year orbital period. It was fortuitous that one of these intervals happened to occur soon after Charon's discovery.

Name

After its discovery, Charon was first given the temporary designation S/1978 P 1, following the then recently instituted convention. On June 24, 1978, Christy first suggested the name Charon as a scientific-sounding version of his wife Charlene's nickname, "Char". Although colleagues at the Naval Observatory proposed Persephone, Christy stuck with Charon after discovering that it was serendipitously the name of an appropriate mythological figure: Charon is the ferryman of the dead, closely associated with the god Pluto. The IAU officially adopted the name in late 1985, and it was announced on January 3, 1986.

Coincidentally, nearly four decades before Charon's discovery, science fiction author Edmond Hamilton had invented three moons of Pluto for his 1940 novel Calling Captain Future and named them Charon, Styx, and Cerberus.

There is minor debate over the preferred pronunciation of the name. The mythological figure is pronounced with a  sound, and this is often followed for the moon as well. However, Christy himself pronounced the initial  as a  sound, as he had named the moon after his wife Charlene. Many English-speaking astronomers follow the classical convention, but others follow Christy's, and that is the prescribed pronunciation at NASA and of the New Horizons team.

After a request in 2015 from the International Astronomical Union for suggestions for names to name mountains, craters, etc. on the moon, it was decided in 2018 to use names from literary figures, explorers and from mythology. For example 'Butler Mons', 'Clarke Montes', 'Kubrick Mons', 'Nemo Crater', 'Dorothy Crater'.

Formation 
Simulation work published in 2005 by Robin Canup suggested that Charon could have been formed by a collision around 4.5 billion years ago, much like Earth and the Moon. In this model, a large Kuiper belt object struck Pluto at high velocity, destroying itself and blasting off much of Pluto's outer mantle, and Charon coalesced from the debris. However, such an impact should result in an icier Charon and rockier Pluto than scientists have found. It is now thought that Pluto and Charon might have been two bodies that collided before going into orbit about each other. The collision would have been violent enough to boil off volatile ices like methane but not violent enough to have destroyed either body. The very similar density of Pluto and Charon implies that the parent bodies were not fully differentiated when the impact occurred.

Atmosphere 
Charon has no significant atmosphere. There has been speculation about a minuscule atmosphere surrounding the moon, but there has been no indication of anything substantial.

Pluto does have a thin but significant atmosphere, and under some conditions Charon's gravitation pulls some of Pluto's upper atmosphere, specifically nitrogen, from Pluto's ice formations, toward Charon's surface. The nitrogen is mostly caught in the combined center of gravity between the two bodies before reaching Charon, but any gas that does reach Charon is held closely against the surface. The gas is mostly made up of ions of nitrogen, but the amounts are negligible compared to the total of Pluto's atmosphere. 

The many spectral signatures of ice formations on the surface of Charon have led some to believe that the ice formations could supply an atmosphere, but atmosphere supplying formations have not been confirmed yet. Many scientists theorize that these ice formations could be concealed out of direct sight, either in deep craters or beneath Charon's surface. Similar to how Pluto transfers atmosphere to Charon, Charon's relatively low gravity, due to its low mass, causes any atmosphere that might be present to rapidly escape the surface into space. Even through stellar occultation, which is used to probe the atmosphere of stellar bodies, scientists cannot confirm an existing atmosphere; this was tested in 1986 while attempting to perform stellar occultation testing on Pluto. Charon also acts as a protector for Pluto's atmosphere, blocking the solar wind that would normally collide with Pluto, damaging its atmosphere. Since Charon blocks these solar winds, its own atmosphere is diminished, instead of Pluto's. This effect is also a serious potential explanation for Charon's lack of atmosphere; when it begins to accumulate, the solar winds shut it down. Although, it is still possible for Charon to have an atmosphere. As previously stated, Pluto transfers some of its atmospheric gas to Charon, from where it tends to escape into space. Assuming Charon's density is 1.71 g/cm3, which is the rough estimate we currently have, it would have a surface gravity of 0.6 of Pluto's. It also has a higher mean molecular weight than Pluto and a lower exobase surface temperature, so that the gases in its atmosphere would not escape as rapidly from Charon as they do from Pluto. 

There has been significant proof of CO2 gas and H2O vapor on the surface of Charon, but these vapors are not sufficient for a viable atmosphere due to their low vapor pressures. Pluto's surface has abundant ice formations, but these are volatile, as they are made up of volatile substances like methane. These volatile ice structures cause a good deal of geological activity, keeping its atmosphere constant, while Charon's ice structures are mainly made up of water and carbon dioxide, much less volatile substances that can stay dormant and not affect the atmosphere much.

Orbit

Charon and Pluto orbit each other every 6.387 days. The two objects are gravitationally locked to one another, so each keeps the same face towards the other. This is a case of mutual tidal locking, as compared to that of the Earth and the Moon, where the Moon always shows the same face to Earth, but not vice versa. The discovery of Charon allowed astronomers to calculate accurately the mass of the Plutonian system, and mutual occultations revealed their sizes. However, neither indicated the two bodies' individual masses, which could only be estimated, until the discovery of Pluto's outer moons in late 2005. Details in the orbits of the outer moons revealed that Charon has approximately 12% of the mass of Pluto.

Physical characteristics

Larger than the dwarf planet Ceres, it is the twelfth-largest natural satellite in the Solar System. Charon is even similar in size to Uranus's moons Umbriel and Ariel. Charon's slow rotation means that there should be little flattening or tidal distortion, if Charon is sufficiently massive to be in hydrostatic equilibrium. Any deviation from a perfect sphere is too small to have been detected by observations by the New Horizons mission. This is in contrast to Iapetus, a Saturnian moon similar in size to Charon but with a pronounced oblateness dating to early in its history. The lack of such oblateness in Charon could mean that it is currently in hydrostatic equilibrium, or simply that its orbit approached its current one early in its history, when it was still warm.

Based on mass updates from observations made by New Horizons the mass ratio of Charon to Pluto is 0.1218:1. This is much larger than the Moon to the Earth: 0.0123:1. Because of the high mass ratio, the barycenter is outside of the radius of Pluto, and the Pluto–Charon system has been referred to as a dwarf double planet. With four smaller satellites in orbit about the two larger worlds, the Pluto–Charon system has been considered in studies of the orbital stability of circumbinary planets.

Interior 

Charon's volume and mass allow calculation of its density, from which it can be determined that Charon is slightly less dense than Pluto and suggesting a composition of 55% rock to 45% ice (± 5%), whereas Pluto is about 70% rock. The difference is considerably lower than that of most suspected collisional satellites. Before New Horizons''' flyby, there were two conflicting theories about Charon's internal structure: some scientists thought Charon to be a differentiated body like Pluto, with a rocky core and an icy mantle, whereas others thought it would be uniform throughout. Evidence in support of the former position was found in 2007, when observations by the Gemini Observatory of patches of ammonia hydrates and water crystals on the surface of Charon suggested the presence of active cryogeysers. The fact that the ice was still in crystalline form suggested it had been deposited recently, because solar radiation would have degraded it to an amorphous state after roughly thirty thousand years.

 Surface 

Unlike Pluto's surface, which is composed of nitrogen and methane ices, Charon's surface appears to be dominated by the less volatile water ice. In 2007, observations by the Gemini Observatory of patches of ammonia hydrates and water crystals on the surface of Charon suggested the presence of active cryogeysers and cryovolcanoes.

Photometric mapping of Charon's surface shows a latitudinal trend in albedo, with a bright equatorial band and darker poles. The north polar region is dominated by a very large dark area informally dubbed "Mordor" by the New Horizons team. The favored explanation for this feature is that it is formed by condensation of gases that escaped from Pluto's atmosphere. In winter, the temperature is −258 °C, and these gases, which include nitrogen, carbon monoxide, and methane, condense into their solid forms; when these ices are subjected to solar radiation, they chemically react to form various reddish tholins. Later, when the area is again heated by the Sun as Charon's seasons change, the temperature at the pole rises to −213 °C, resulting in the volatiles sublimating and escaping Charon, leaving only the tholins behind. Over millions of years, the residual tholin builds up thick layers, obscuring the icy crust. In addition to Mordor, New Horizons found evidence of extensive past geology that suggests that Charon is probably differentiated; in particular, the southern hemisphere has fewer craters than the northern and is considerably less rugged, suggesting that a massive resurfacing event—perhaps prompted by the partial or complete freezing of an internal ocean—occurred at some point in the past and removed many of the earlier craters.

In 2018, the International Astronomical Union named one crater on Charon, as  Revati who is a character in the Hindu epic Mahabharata.

Charon has a series of extensive grabens or canyons, such as Serenity Chasma, which extend as an equatorial belt for at least .

 Mountain in a moat 

In a released photo by New Horizons, an unusual surface feature has captivated and baffled the scientist team of the mission. The image reveals a mountain rising out of a depression. It's "a large mountain sitting in a moat", said Jeff Moore, of NASA's Ames Research Center, in a statement. "This is a feature that has geologists stunned and stumped", he added.

Observation and exploration
Since the first blurred images of the moon (1), images showing Pluto and Charon resolved into separate disks were taken for the first time by the Hubble Space Telescope in the 1990s (2). The telescope was responsible for the best, yet low quality images of the moon. In 1994, the clearest picture of the Pluto–Charon system showed two distinct and well defined disks (3). The image was taken by Hubble's Faint Object Camera (FOC) when the system was 4.4 billion kilometers (2.6 billion miles) away from Earth Later, the development of adaptive optics made it possible to resolve Pluto and Charon into separate disks using ground-based telescopes.

In June 2015, the New Horizons spacecraft captured consecutive images of the Pluto–Charon system as it approached it. The images were put together in an animation. It was the best image of Charon to that date (4). In July 2015, the New Horizons'' spacecraft made its closest approach to the Pluto system. It is the only spacecraft to date to have visited and studied Charon.  Charon's discoverer James Christy and the children of Clyde Tombaugh were guests at the Johns Hopkins Applied Physics Laboratory during the New Horizons closest approach.

Classification 

The center of mass (barycenter) of the Pluto–Charon system lies outside either body. Because neither object truly orbits the other, and Charon has 12.2% the mass of Pluto, it has been argued that Charon should be considered to be part of a binary planet with Pluto. The International Astronomical Union (IAU) states that Charon is considered to be just a satellite of Pluto, but the idea that Charon might be classified as a dwarf planet in its own right may be considered at a later date.

In a draft proposal for the 2006 redefinition of the term, the IAU proposed that a planet be defined as a body that orbits the Sun that is large enough for gravitational forces to render the object (nearly) spherical. Under this proposal, Charon would have been classified as a planet, because the draft explicitly defined a planetary satellite as one in which the barycenter lies within the major body. In the final definition, Pluto was reclassified as a dwarf planet, but the formal definition of a planetary satellite was not decided upon. Charon is not in the list of dwarf planets currently recognized by the IAU. Had the draft proposal been accepted, even the Moon would hypothetically be classified as a planet in billions of years when the tidal acceleration that is gradually moving the Moon away from Earth takes it far enough away that the center of mass of the system no longer lies within Earth.

The other moons of Pluto Nix, Hydra, Kerberos and Styx orbit the same barycenter but they are not large enough to be spherical and they are simply considered to be satellites of Pluto (or of Pluto–Charon).

Gallery

Videos

See also 
List of natural satellites

Notes

References

External links

 Charon Profile at NASA's Solar System Exploration site
 
 Hubble reveals new map of Pluto, BBC News, September 12, 2005
 
 Cryovolcanism on Charon and other Kuiper Belt Objects
 New Horizons Camera Spots Pluto’s Largest Moon – July 10, 2013
 New Horizons in the PHSF clean room at KSC, Nov 4, 2005
 40th anniversary NASA video describing the discovery and naming of Charon (June 22, 2018)
 NASA CGI video of Charon flyover (July 14, 2017)
 CGI video simulation of rotating Charon by Seán Doran (see album for more)
 Google Charon 3D, interactive map of the moon
 
 Interactive 3D gravity simulation of Pluto and Charon in addition to Pluto's four other moons Styx, Kerberos, Hydra and Nix 

 
Moons of Pluto
Trans-Neptunian satellites
Articles containing video clips
M
Planetary-mass satellites
Moons with a prograde orbit